The Gordini T32 was an open-wheel formula racing car, designed, developed and built by French manufacturer Gordini, for the  and  Formula One World Championship seasons.

Background
In 1955 Gordini presented a completely new Formula 1 racing car. The T32 was unveiled at the Montlhéry circuit. While Gordini had retained the ladder-type frame construction, the T32 had independent wheel suspension and disc brakes. The eight-cylinder in-line engine had a displacement of 2.5 liters and delivered 250 hp.

However, the car was too heavy and the two copies built were inferior to the competition. Another problem was the cooling of the internal rear brakes. This was remedied by air slots in the body.

Élie Bayol and André Pilette scored their first points with the T32 at the 1956 Monaco Grand Prix, where they shared sixth place. It should remain the only placement with a T32 in the points at a world championship race.

References

Formula One cars
Open wheel racing cars
1950s cars
Cars of France